Niagara Park railway station is located on the Main Northern line in New South Wales, Australia. It serves the northern Central Coast suburb of Niagara Park opening in October 1902 as Tundula. On 27 November 1902 it was renamed Niagara Park.

The station was upgraded in August 2021 with lifts added to the existing footbridge.

Platforms & services
Niagara Park has one island platform with two faces. It is serviced by NSW TrainLink Central Coast & Newcastle Line services travelling from Sydney Central to Newcastle. Peak-hour services travel from Central to Wyong via the North Shore line.

Transport links
Busways operate two routes via Niagara Park station:
36: Gosford station to Westfield Tuggerah via Narara
37: Gosford station to Westfield Tuggerah via Wyoming

References

External links

Niagara Park station details Transport for New South Wales

Transport on the Central Coast (New South Wales)
Railway stations in Australia opened in 1902
Regional railway stations in New South Wales
Short-platform railway stations in New South Wales, 4 cars
Main North railway line, New South Wales